Campodea frenata is a species of two-pronged bristletail in the family Campodeidae.

Subspecies
These two subspecies belong to the species Campodea frenata:
 Campodea frenata frenata Silvestri, 1931 g
 Campodea frenata malpighii Drenovski, 1937 g
Data sources: i = ITIS, c = Catalogue of Life, g = GBIF, b = Bugguide.net

References

Further reading

 
 
 
 
 
 
 
 

Diplura
Animals described in 1931